The Gurage (Gurage: ጉራጌ, ቤተ-ጉርዓ, ቤተ-ጉራጌ) are a Semitic-speaking ethnic group inhabiting Ethiopia. They inhabit the Gurage Zone, a fertile, semi-mountainous region in central Ethiopia, about 125 kilometers southwest of Addis Ababa, bordering the Awash River in the north, the Gibe River, a tributary of the Omo River(ዋቤ), to the southwest, and Hora-Dambal in the east.

According to the 2007 Ethiopian national census the Gurage can also be found in large numbers in Addis Ababa, Oromia Region, Dire Dawa, Harari Region, Somali Region, Amhara Region, Gambela Region, Benishangul-Gumuz Region, and Tigray Region.

History

According to the historian Paul B. Henze, the Gurage origin is explained by traditions of a military expedition to the south during the last years of the Kingdom of Aksum, which left military colonies that eventually became isolated from both northern Ethiopia and each other. However other historians have raised the issue of the complexity of Gurage peoples if viewed as a singular group, for example Ulrich Braukhamper states that the Gurage East people may have been an extension of the ancient Harla people. Indeed, there is evidence that Harla architecture may have influenced old buildings (pre-16th c.) found near Harar (eastern Ethiopia), and the Gurage East group often cite kinship with Harari (Hararghe) peoples in the distant past. 

Braukhamper also states King Amda Seyon ordered Eritrean troops to be sent to mountainous regions in Gurage (named Gerege), which eventually became a permanent settlement. In addition to Amda Seyon's military settlement there, the permanence of Abyssinian presence in Gurage is documented during his descendants Zara Yaqob and Dawit II's reigns. Thus, historically, Gurage peoples may be the product of a complex mixture of Abyssinian and Harla groups which migrated and settled in that region for different reasons and at various times.

Another stated that the Gurage were originated from a place called Gura, Eritrea. This believed that linguistically by citing a southward Semitic migration during the late classical and medieval period; however more historical research needed. 

A single military expedition explanation is likely  possible for soldiers to implant their language in the region effectively.  However the extent of Aksumite political and economic control over the interior Ethiopian Highlands, as well as that of successor dynasties dominating the Christian north, is being studied. Aside from local oral traditions linking their past to areas farther north, the Gurage countryside is home to orthodox Christian monasteries likely dating to the Middle Ages (Debre Tsion Maryam, Muher Iyesus, Abuna Gebre Menfes Kiddus, and others), before the conquests of Ahmad ibn Ibrahim al-Ghazi and subsequent Oromo migrations into the central Highlands.

Language

The Gurage languages are a subgroup of the Ethiopian Semitic languages within the Semitic family of the Afroasiatic language family. They have three subgroups: Northern, Eastern and Western. 

Gurage languages include Sebat Bet, Inor, Ezha, Muher, Geta, Gumer, Endegegn, Chaha, and Soddo, Masqan, Zay. Like other Ethiopian Semitic languages, the Gurage languages is heavily influenced by the surrounding non-Semitic Afroasiatic Cushitic languages. Gurage is written left to right using a system based on the Geʽez script.

Gurage Region 

The majority of the inhabitants of the Gurage Zone were reported as Muslim, with 51.02% of the population reporting that belief, while 41.91% practiced Ethiopian Orthodox Christianity, 5.79% were Protestants, and 1.12% Catholic. According to the 1994 Ethiopian census, self-identifying Gurage comprise about 2.7% of Ethiopia's population, or about 1.4 million people. The populations of Gurage people are not exactly known because approximately half of the population live outside of the Gurage zone.

The Gurage People

The Gurage, the writer Nega Mezlekia notes, "have earned a reputation as skilled traders". One example of an enterprising Gurage is Tekke, who Nathaniel T. Kenney described as "an Ethiopian Horatio Alger, Jr.": "He began his career selling old bottles and tin cans; the Emperor Haile Selassiere rewarded his achievement in creating his plantation by calling him to Addis Ababa and decorating him."

The Gurage people are highly entrepreneurial people with a culture of social mobility that celebrates hard work. As a result, the Gurage are represented in all business sectors in Ethiopia, ranging from shoe shiners to owners of big businesses. Commonly, the Addis Ababa Merkato attributed to them. They are model of good work culture in the whole Ethiopia. One of the most famous Ethiopian musicians, Mohamoud Ahmed, still recalls how he started out in life shining shoes in the city before he got his break and joined the music orchestra that allowed him to capture the imagination of millions of admirers both in Ethiopia and abroad.

Agriculture

The Gurage live a sedentary life based on agriculture, involving a complex system of crop rotation and transplanting. Ensete is the main staple food, Teff and other cash crops are grown, which include coffee and khat which used as traditional stimulants. Animal husbandry is practiced, mainly for milk supply and dung. Other foods consumed include green cabbage, cheese, butter, roasted grains, meat and others.

The principal crop of the Gurage is ensete (also enset, Ensete edulis, äsät or "false banana plant").  This has a massive stem that grows underground and is involved in every aspect of Gurage life. It has a place in everyday interactions among community members as well as specific roles in rituals. For example: the ritual uses of ensete include wrapping a corpse after death with the fronds and tying off the umbilical cord after birth with an ensete fiber; the practical uses include wrapping goods and fireproofing thatch.  Ensete is also exchanged as part of a variety of social interactions, and used as a recompense for services rendered.

Ensete can be prepared in a variety of ways. A normal Gurage diet consists primarily of kocho, a thick bread made from ensete, and is supplemented by cabbage, cheese, butter and grains. Meat is not consumed on a regular basis, but usually eaten when an animal is sacrificed during a ritual or ceremonial event. The Gurage pound the root of the ensete to extract the edible substance, then place it in deep pits between the rows of ensete plants in the field.  It ferments in the pit, which makes it more palatable.  It can be stored for up to several years in this fashion, and the Gurage typically retain large surpluses of ensete as a protection against famine.

In addition to ensete, cash crops are maintained (notably coffee and khat) and livestock is raised (mainly for milk and fertilizer). Some Gurage also plant teff and eat injera (which the Gurage also call injera).

The Gurage raise zebu. These cattle are primarily kept for their butter, and a typical Gurage household has a large quantity of spiced butter aging in clay pots hung from the walls of their huts. Butter is believed to be medicinal, and the Gurage often take it internally or use it a lotion or poultice. A Gurage proverb states that "A sickness that has the upper hand over butter is destined for death." Different species of ensete are also eaten to alleviate illness.

The Gurage regard overeating as coarse and vulgar, and regard it as poor etiquette to eat all of the ensete that a host passes around to guests. It is considered polite to leave at least some ensete bread even after a very small portion is passed around.

Cuisine
The Gurage in rural highland areas centers their lives on the cultivation of their staple crop ensete. Kocho is made by shaping the ensete paste into a thick circle and wrapping it in a thin layer of ensete leaves. Its baked in a small pit with coals.  Sometimes the paste is just cooked over a griddle. Kitfo a minced raw beef mixed with butter and spicy pepper is commonly attributed to the Gurage. It is also supplemented by cabbage, cheese, butter, and grains.

Notable Gurages
Balcha Safo
Desta Damtew
Habte Giyorgis Dinagde
Mahmoud Ahmed
Selemon Barega

Notes

References
 Lebel, Phillip, 1974. "Oral Traditional and Chronicles on Guragé Immigration." in Journal of Ethiopian Studies  by Institute of Ethiopian Studies. Vol. 12 (2): pp.  95–106.
 G. W. E. Huntingford, 1966. Bulletin of the School of Oriental and African Studies, 29, pp 667–667 doi:10.1017/S0041977X00073857
 Shack, William, 1966: The Guraghe. A People of the Ensete Culture, London – New York – Nairobi: Oxford University Press.
 Shack, William,1997: "Hunger, Anxiety, and Ritual: Deprivation and Spirit Possession among the Gurage of Ethiopia" in Food and Culture: A Reader (pp. 125–137). Ed. Carole Counihan and Penny van Esterik. New York: Routledge.
 Worku Nida 2005: "Guraghe ethno-historical survey". In: Siegbert Uhlig (ed.): Encyclopaedia Aethiopica. Vol. 2: D-Ha. Wiesbaden: Harrassowitz. pp. 929–935.

External links
 Gurage Research blog
 Gurage and Silte Research Group
 The Gurage People – Carolyn Ford with SIM in Ethiopia
 Facts about Gurage 
 GeoHive
 Google map of Gurage

Habesha peoples
Ethnic groups in Ethiopia